Enda Williams (born 1985) is a Gaelic footballer from County Longford, Ireland. He was a panel member of the Longford county team from 2004 to 2011. In 2012 he joined the Leitrim county team, where he spent 18 months before announcing his return to Longford in November 2013.

He was captain of the Longford minor team that won the 2002 Leinster Minor Championship when they beat Meath in the final. He then moved on to the Under 21 side and played in the 2003 Leinster Final but lost out to Dublin in the final. He played in an O'Byrne Cup final in 2007 but lost out to Dublin again, he also won 2 O'Byrne Shield medals in 2006 and 2007. In 2011 he helped Longford overcome Roscommon in the National Football League Div 4 final at Croke Park.

He played his club football with Clonguish with whom he won 3 Longford Senior Football Championships in 2003, 2004 and 2009. He also plays hurling with the club and won Longford Senior Hurling Championships in 2003, 2005 and 2006.

References
 http://hoganstand.com/Longford/ArticleForm.aspx?ID=88988
 http://hoganstand.com/longford/ArticleForm.aspx?ID=165445
 http://hoganstand.com/longford/ArticleForm.aspx?ID=141757
 http://hoganstand.com/Longford/ArticleForm.aspx?ID=19145

1985 births
Living people
Clonguish Gaelic footballers
Clonguish hurlers
Dual players
Gaelic football backs
Leitrim inter-county Gaelic footballers
Longford inter-county Gaelic footballers